The City of Hawkesbury is a local government area of New South Wales, Australia, the City of Hawkesbury is located on the North and North Western edge of the Greater Sydney region and is adjacent to the Sydney metropolitan area, about  north-west of the Sydney central business district. Hawkesbury City is named after the Hawkesbury River.

The Mayor of the City of Hawkesbury is Cr. Sarah McMahon, a member of the Liberal Party.

Suburbs and localities 
Suburbs and localities in the City of Hawkesbury are:

History
The original inhabitants of the Hawkesbury district were the Darug tribe of Aboriginals, also spelt as Dharug or Daruk. The river, which they called Derrubbin, was a focal point as a source of food and transport. The Darug people used the river to farm for fish, eels, water birds, and mussels. They also used the river as a mode of transport in bark canoes.

It was first settled by Europeans in 1794 in a bid to acquire arable land to feed the increasing population of the penal colony at Sydney. In April 1794, Lieutenant Governor Francis Grose submitted plans for the first 22 farms on the Hawkesbury River in the present Pitt Town Bottoms area. In June 1795 a camp of Aboriginal peoples opposing the landtakings was harassed by a British regiment commanded by Paterson (who later regretted the necessary injustice).

By 1811 Governor Lachlan Macquarie established the five Macquarie Towns in the area. They are Windsor, Richmond, Castlereagh, Wilberforce and Pitt Town. Many of the early 19th century buildings still survive today. Ebenezer has the oldest surviving church and school building in Australia. Windsor District Council was formed in 1843 and disbanded in 1846.  In 1871 the Borough Council of Windsor was founded and the Richmond Borough Council followed in 1872. The two councils amalgamated in 1949 to become the Municipality of Windsor. Colo Shire Council was established in 1906 and joined Windsor Municipal Council from 1 January 1981 to become Hawkesbury Shire Council. On 1 July 1989, Hawkesbury became a City.

On its creation in 1981, Hawkesbury was largely rural, but urban expansion within Sydney has since transformed the southern part of the area into dormitory suburbs. The northern part of the local government area still contains some farmlands and national parkland.

Demographics
At the 2016 Census, there were  people in the Hawkesbury local government area. Of these, 49.5% were male and 50.5% were female. Aboriginal and Torres Strait Islander people made up 3.7% of the population, which is 1.3% above the national average. The median age of people in the City of Hawkesbury was 38 years. Children aged 0 – 14 years made up 19.9% of the population and people aged 65 years and over made up 14.4% of the population. Of people in the area aged 15 years and over, 49.3% were married and 12.4% were either divorced or separated.

Population in the City of Hawkesbury between the 2001 Census and the 2006 Census decreased by 0.54%; and in the subsequent five years to the 2011 Census, population growth was 2.96%. Between the 2011 and 2016 Census, population increased by a further 1.04%. When compared with total population growth of Australia for the same periods, population growth in Hawkesbury local government area was significantly lower than the national average. The median weekly income for residents within the City of Hawkesbury has been consistently marginally higher than the national average.

At the 2016 Census, the proportion of residents in the Hawkesbury local government area who stated their ancestry as Australian or English amounted to 60%, which decreased from 62% in 2011. The majority of people from the Hawkesbury identified as having a Catholic (27.5%) or Anglican (24.6%) religious affiliation in 2016.

Council

Current composition and election method
Hawkesbury City Council is composed of twelve Councillors elected proportionally as one entire ward. All Councillors are elected for a fixed four-year term of office. The Mayor is elected by the Councillors at the first meeting of the council. The most recent election was held on 4 December 2021, and the makeup of the council is as follows:

The current Council, elected in 2021, in order of election, is:

The previous Council, elected in 2016, went for a term of five years owing to the COVID emergency.

Mayors

See also

Local government in New South Wales

References

External links 
Hawkesbury City Council - Home

 
Hawkesbury
Hawkesbury
Hawkesbury